Max Deml (born 1957) is a German-Austrian writer for environmental and financial magazines, publisher and entrepreneur.

Since October 1991 he has been editor-in-chief of Ökoinvest, a bi-weekly German-language stock market newsletter concentrating on socially responsible, sustainable investments and renewable energies. He developed green stock and fund indexes like NX-25 in 2003.

Career 
Deml studied psychology, philosophy and political science in Regensburg and later in Vienna.

He founded Öko-Invest Publishing Ltd. in June 1991 after dropping out of university. He went on to co-found companies like BioArt AG (organic and fair trade food), Fair Finance Holding AG, Grassmugg AG, and GreenTec Invest AG and Prodigium Pictures. Additionally, he serves as chairman of the board of several Austrian companies. He is member of the Environmental Advisory Board of Oeco Capital Life Insurance in Germany and the fund committee of the World Wide Fund of Nature Austria. Since 1990, he has been co-author of the handbook Grünes Geld (English: Green Money).

Since 2012, Deml has been performing a standup comedy program entitled "Grünes Geld und Frische Blüten - ein C(r)ashkurs" (English : "Green Money and Fresh Dough - a C(r)ash Course").

References 

1957 births
People from Cham (district)
Austrian comedians
Sustainability advocates
Austrian male writers
Ethical investment
Austrian publishers (people)
Austrian investors
Austrian financial analysts
Austrian non-fiction writers
People associated with wind power
People associated with solar power
Living people
Male non-fiction writers